AS-28 is a  of the Russian Navy, which entered service in 1986. It was designed for submarine rescue operations by the Lazurit Design Bureau in Nizhny Novgorod.

Training accident

On August 5, 2005 AS-28, under the command of Lieutenant Vyacheslav Milashevskiy, became entangled with the aerial of a hydrophone array off the coast of the Kamchatka Peninsula, in Berezovaya Bay, 70 km southeast of Petropavlovsk-Kamchatskiy, Kamchatka Oblast. The aerial, anchored by 60-tonne concrete blocks, snared the propeller of the submarine, and the submarine then sank to the seafloor at a depth of 190 m (600 ft). This was too deep for the ship's complement of seven to leave the submarine and swim to the surface. British rescuers and Russian officials stated that fishing nets also had entangled the vessel.

On August 6, Russian President Vladimir Putin ordered Russian Minister of Defence Sergei Ivanov to fly to Petropavlovsk-Kamchatsky to oversee the rescue operation, which was under the command of the Commander of the Russian Pacific Fleet, Admiral Viktor Fedorov.

On August 7, all seven sailors were rescued after the cables snaring their submarine were cut by a British remotely operated vehicle (ROV).  The submarine surfaced at 4:26 p.m. local time on Sunday and all seven crewmen exited the vessel without assistance.

International appeal
The Russian Navy requested assistance after at least 24 hours, much faster than their response when the Kursk sank on August 12, 2000.  It was suggested that the Russians may have called for help so quickly this time as they were on a recent exercise with NATO forces for just such an eventuality.

Immediate support was offered by the Royal Navy, Japan Maritime Self-Defense Force and the United States Navy. The United Kingdom sent a Scorpio 45 ROV via C-17 Globemaster III cargo aircraft and a team to operate it.  The United States sent one unmanned Super Scorpio ROV from San Diego, airlifted via C-5 Galaxy transport.  Each unmanned vehicle was also accompanied by a team to operate it.  It was intended that these unmanned rescue vessels, with their robotic arms, would be able to cut the nets or cables that anchored the submarine.   The American ROV was assembled on the Priz support ship although they were not required to get underway as the British Scorpio was able to execute the rescue. A tactical decision by the PACFLT command team in Pearl Harbor, allowed the British crew to use the limited local resources toward one rescue asset. The British team's efforts resulted in a successful rescue.

Rescue 
Russian admiral Fedorov (Fyodorov) first discussed using explosives to cut the antenna but those tactics were never employed. The Russian oceangoing tugs MB-105 and KIL-168 instead attempted to lift the stricken craft to the surface using underslung cables. This attempt proved futile.  Meanwhile, to conserve energy and oxygen, the crew of the AS-28 shut down the submarine's non-essential systems (including the heater), donned thermal suits, and rested.

The British Scorpio was the only foreign remotely operated vehicle to arrive and be deployed.  It successfully cut away the cables which had snagged the submarine while surface ships had retreated a safe distance. On August 7, 2005 at 16:26 local time (03:26 UTC), the saga came to a close when the vessel successfully surfaced.  All seven crewmen were alive and able to climb out of the vessel within moments of its surfacing.  They had been trapped in the vessel for over 76 hours and rescuers found that they had only enough oxygen to last at most 12 more hours.  They also were desperately short of water, of which they had had only three or four mouthfuls a day.

The story of the submarine's rescue was featured on the BBC One documentary Submarine Rescue. The documentary was subsequently awarded the accolade of "best documentary" by the British Maritime Society. The rescue of AS-28 by Scorpio was also featured as the subject of the tenth episode of the 2007-8 documentary series Critical Situation, entitled "Running Out of Air".

The submariners
 Vyacheslav Milashevskiy (Вячеслав Милашевский), captain-lieutenant, 25-year-old commanding officer of the vessel. 
 Anatoliy Popov (Анатолий Попов), senior lieutenant, navigator
 Sergey Belozerov (Сергей Белозеров), senior warrant officer
 Alexandr Ivanov (Александр Иванов), senior warrant officer
 Alexandr Uybin (Александр Уйбин), warrant officer
and also
 Valeriy Lepetyukha (Валерий Лепетюха), captain of the 1st rank
 Gennadiy Bolonin (Геннадий Болонин),  the Deputy Director of Lazurit, the organization that built AS-28.

Note 1:  Midshipman pronounced and written in Russian [michman] (мичман) is a warrant officer rank in the Russian Navy

Repercussions
The Guardian reports questions have been raised over how long Russian officials waited to request help. The first exposure of the accident came when the wife of a crewman called a radio station 24 hours later, and the wife of commander Milashevsky claims they were actually stranded Wednesday. Kommersant reports that the head of the Navy Vladimir Kuroyedov, may be relieved over this, the Kursk, and other accidents. BBC also reports that in July, an ICBM test firing witnessed by Putin failed to launch twice; then exploded soon after launch the next day. Although officials claimed the AS-28 crew had food and water for five days, they were actually desperately short of water. There were also alternating stories about whether the submarine was caught on an aerial or fishing nets; nets and cables were visible on TV footage of the ROV in action. Russian prosecutors have opened a criminal investigation into the affair, and their Navy plans to buy two of the £700,000 to £3 million Scorpio ROVs.

See also
 
 Russian submarine

References

External links
 US NAVY CALLS UPON PHOENIX FOR SUBMARINE RESCUE SUPPORT
 Rescuing the Rescue Submarine - Hammernews
Rescued submarine crew tell of 76-hour ordeal- Guardian
  Press haunted by Kursk memories (Russian reports via BBC)
 Where the submarine was stranded (BBC)
 Russians race to rescue sailors (BBC) August 6, 2005
 Russia races to free trapped mini-sub (Reuters Canada) August 6, 2005
 World unites to save young skipper and 6 crew (The Age, Australia) August 6, 2005
 Submarine Rescue Teams Prepare to Use Explosives to Free Vessel (Bloomberg News) August 6, 2005
 Official: Russian rescuers lifting disabled sub (CNN) August 6, 2005
 Rescuers Attempt to Lift Russian Mini-Sub to Let Divers Work — Navy Official (MosNews.com) 6 August 2005
 Trapped sub surfaces, crew safe (CNN) August 7, 2005
 Russische Marine wollte U-Boot nicht bergen

Submarines of the Russian Navy
Priz-class deep-submergence rescue vehicles
Russian submarine accidents
Maritime incidents in 2005
Lifeboats
1985 ships
Ships built in the Soviet Union
Submarines of the Soviet Navy
Ships built by Krasnoye Sormovo Factory No. 112

de:Pris-Klasse#Der Unfall vor der Kamtschatka-Halbinsel